Peter Ufford is  the former Chancellor of Capilano University, which is located in the District of North Vancouver in British Columbia, Canada.

References

Year of birth missing (living people)
Living people
Canadian university and college chancellors
Capilano University